Rindskopf is a German-Jewish surname, meaning "ox-head". People with this surname include:
David Rindskopf, American psychologist
Maurice H. Rindskopf (1917–2011), American submarine commander of World War II
Peter Rindskopf (1942–1971), American lawyer, son of Maurice Rindskopf

References

German-language surnames